Copelatus concii is a species of diving beetle. It is part of the genus Copelatus in the subfamily Copelatinae of the family Dytiscidae. It was described by Billardo in 1982.

References

concii
Beetles described in 1982